The 2006 Sultan of Selangor Cup was played on 10 May 2006, at Singapore National Stadium in Kallang, Singapore. This match marks the second time the competition is played in Singapore.

Match 
Source:

Players 

Source:

Veterans 
A match between veterans of two teams are also held in the same day before the real match starts as a curtain raiser.

References 

2006 in Malaysian football
Selangor FA
Sultan of Selangor Cup